Sam Spruell (born 1 January 1977) is a British actor. He is best known for playing villainous roles in film and television including Oleg Malankov in Taken 3, Finn in Snow White and the Huntsman and Swarm in Doctor Who: Flux. He also appeared in a small role as a military contractor in the 2009 film The Hurt Locker.

Career
His film credits include The Hurt Locker (2008), Defiance (2008), Elizabeth: The Golden Age (2007), London to Brighton (2006), To Kill a King (2003) and K-19: The Widowmaker (2002). Spruell played hit man Jack "The Hat" McVitie in the 2015 film Legend, which told the story of the Kray twins.

His television roles include the recurring cameo of Jason Belling in Spooks (2007 in Episode 6.9 and 2004 in Project Friendly Fire) and the recurring role of Wilkes in P.O.W. (2003).

In 2012, Spruell had a starring role in the film Snow White & the Huntsman, playing the brother to the Evil Queen played by Charlize Theron.

In March 2013 he appeared in one of the lead roles in the BBC One thriller drama series Mayday. He appeared in the television adaptation of The Last Ship later in the year. In 2015, Spruell played Oleg Malankov, the secondary villain in Taken 3. He also played Owen Lynch in the drama series Luther in episode 1.2. He appeared as the character Swarm in the thirteenth series of Doctor Who.

Filmography

External links
 
 
 

British male film actors
1977 births
Living people
British male television actors
21st-century British male actors
20th-century British male actors
British emigrants to the United States
People from Southwark